Evelyn Ratigan Smith (born August 30, 1945) is an American former businesswoman, former educator, and current politician from Georgia. Smith is a Republican member of the Georgia House of Representatives since 1997.

Early life 
On August 30, 1945, Smith was born in Orlando, Florida.

Career 
Smith was a businesswoman and a French and Social Studies teacher at Newnan Schools.

On November 5, 1996, Smith won the election and became a Republican member of Georgia House of Representatives for District 103. Smith defeated Dock H. Davis with 60.13% of the votes. On November 3, 1998, as an incumbent, Smith won the election unopposed and continued serving District 103. On November 7, 2000, as an incumbent, Smith won the election unopposed and continued serving District 103.

On November 5, 2002, Smith won the election unopposed and became a Republican member of Georgia House of Representatives for District 87.

On November 2, 2004, Smith won the election and became a Republican member of Georgia House of Representatives for District 70. On November 3, 2020, as an incumbent, Smith won the election unopposed and continued serving District 70.

Personal life 
Smith's husband is Charles. They have two children. Smith and her family live in Newnan, Georgia.

References

External links 
 Lynn Smith at ballotpedia.org
 lynnsmithforhouse.com

|-

|-

1945 births
21st-century American politicians
21st-century American women politicians
20th-century American politicians
20th-century American women politicians
People from Newnan, Georgia
People from Orlando, Florida
Schoolteachers from Georgia (U.S. state)
Living people
Republican Party members of the Georgia House of Representatives
Women state legislators in Georgia (U.S. state)